Tom Erlandson is a former professional American football player who played linebacker for seven seasons for the Denver Broncos, Miami Dolphins, and San Diego Chargers.

1940 births
Living people
American Football League All-Star players
American Football League players
American football linebackers
Denver Broncos (AFL) players
Miami Dolphins players
San Diego Chargers players
Washington State Cougars football players